Crivăț is a commune in west side of Călărași County, Muntenia, Romania, composed of a single village, Crivăț. It was administered by Budești town until 2006, when it received commune status.

References

Communes in Călărași County
Localities in Muntenia